Fanning may refer to:

 Fanning (bees), a behaviour of worker bees signalling an entrance to a hive
 Fanning (firearms), a shooting technique in which one hand holds a revolver and the other hits the hammer repeatedly
 Fanning (surname)
 Fanning friction factor, a dimensionless number used in fluid flow calculations
 Fan dance, a dance art form
 USS Fanning, ships of the United States Navy

Places
 Cape Fanning, Antarctica
 Fanning Ridge, South Georgia Island
 Fanning, Kansas, United States
 Fanning, Missouri, United States
 Tabuaeran, also known as Fanning Atoll or Fanning Island, one of the Line Islands of the central Pacific Ocean

See also
 Fan (disambiguation)